Eupyrrhoglossum is a genus of moths in the family Sphingidae first described by Augustus Radcliffe Grote in 1865.

Species
Eupyrrhoglossum corvus (Boisduval, 1870)
Eupyrrhoglossum sagra (Poey, 1832)
Eupyrrhoglossum venustum Rothschild & Jordan, 1910

Gallery

References

Dilophonotini
Moth genera
Taxa named by Augustus Radcliffe Grote